The 2017–18 FIS Cross-Country World Cup was the 37th official World Cup season in cross-country skiing for men and women. The season began on 24 November 2017 in Ruka, Finland and ended on 18 March 2018 in Falun, Sweden.

Calendar

Men

Women

Men's team

Women's team

Men's standings

Overall

Distance

Sprint

Prize money

Helvetia U23

Audi Quattro Bonus Ranking

Women's standings

Overall

Distance

Sprint

Prize money

Helvetia U23

Audi Quattro Bonus Ranking

Nations Cup

Overall

Men

Women

Points distribution 
The table shows the number of points won in the 2017/18 Cross-Country Skiing World Cup for men and ladies.

Achievements 

Only individual events.

First World Cup career victory

Men
  Simen Hegstad Krüger, 24, in his 6th season - the WC 6 (15 km F) in Toblach; first podium was 2016–17 WC 7 (10 km F) in Toblach
  Alexander Bolshunov, 21, in his 2nd season - the WC 15 (15 km C) in Lahti; first podium was 2017–18 WC 1 (8th Nordic Opening Overall) in Ruka

Women
  Ragnhild Haga, 26, in her 9th season – the WC 1 (15 km F Pursuit) in Ruka; first podium was 2014–15 WC 8 (3 km F Prologue) in Oberstdorf
  Laurien van der Graaff, 30, in her 9th season – the WC 8 (Sprint F) in Lenzerheide; first podium was 2011–12 WC 3 (Sprint F) in Düsseldorf

First World Cup podium

Men
  Alexander Bolshunov, 20, in his 2nd season – no. 3 in the WC 1 (8th Nordic Opening Overall) in Ruka
  Lucas Chanavat, 23, in his 3rd season – no. 3 in the WC 8 (Sprint F) in Lenzerheide
  Andrey Larkov, 28, in his 6th season – no. 2 in the WC 8 (15 km C Mass Start) in Val di Fiemme
  Denis Spitsov, 21, in his 1st season – no. 3 in the WC 8 (9 km F Pursuit Climb) in Val di Fiemme

Women
  Yuliya Belorukova, 22, in her 4th season – no. 3 in the WC 1 (Sprint C) in Ruka
  Teresa Stadlober, 24, in her 5th season – no. 3 in the WC 8 (10 km C Mass Start) in Val di Fiemme
  Maja Dahlqvist, 23, in her 4th season – no. 2 in the WC 9 (Sprint F) in Dresden
  Kathrine Harsem, 28, in her 9th season – no. 2 in the WC 10 (Sprint C) in Planica
  Natalya Nepryayeva, 22, in her 5th season – no. 2 in the WC 15 (10 km C) in Lahti
  Jonna Sundling, 23, in her 4th season – no. 2 in the WC 18 (Sprint F) in Falun

Victories in this World Cup (all-time number of victories in parentheses)

Men
  Johannes Høsflot Klæbo, 11 (14) first places
  Dario Cologna, 5 (26) first places
  Alexander Bolshunov, 3 (3) first places
  Alexey Poltoranin, 2 (11) first places
  Federico Pellegrino, 2 (11) first places
  Maurice Manificat, 2 (9) first places
  Martin Johnsrud Sundby, 1 (30) first place
  Sergey Ustiugov, 1 (12) first place
  Alex Harvey, 1 (7) first place
  Emil Iversen, 1 (5) first place
  Simen Hegstad Krüger, 1 (1) first place

Women
  Marit Bjørgen, 4 (114) first places
  Ingvild Flugstad Østberg, 4 (11) first places
  Maiken Caspersen Falla, 3 (16) first places
  Stina Nilsson, 3 (15) first places
  Charlotte Kalla, 3 (12) first places
  Heidi Weng, 3 (11) first places
  Krista Pärmäkoski, 3 (5) first places
  Jessie Diggins, 2 (5) first places
  Hanna Falk, 2 (4) first places
  Laurien van der Graaff, 2 (2) first places
  Sophie Caldwell, 1 (2) first place
  Ragnhild Haga, 1 (1) first place

Retirements
Following are notable cross-country skiers who announced their retirement during or after this season:

Men

 

Women

Footnotes

References 

 
FIS Cross-Country World Cup seasons
2017 in cross-country skiing
2018 in cross-country skiing